The 4 × 100 metre mixed freestyle relay competition at the 2022 World Aquatics Championships was held on 24 June 2022.

Records
Prior to the competition, the existing world and championship records were as follows.

The following new records were set during this competition.

Results

Heats
The heats were started at 09:53.

Final
The final was held at 19:49.

References

4 x 100 metre mixed freestyle relay